Gerner Christiansen (13 March 1928 – 3 October 2006) was a Danish sprint canoer who competed in the late 1950s. At the 1956 Summer Olympics in Melbourne, he was disqualified in the finals of the C-2 1000 m event.

References

1928 births
2006 deaths
Canoeists at the 1956 Summer Olympics
Danish male canoeists
Olympic canoeists of Denmark